The 1974 Men's EuroHockey Nations Championship was the second edition of the Men's EuroHockey Nations Championship, the quadrennial international men's field hockey championship of Europe organized by the European Hockey Federation. It was held at Club de Campo Villa de Madrid in Madrid, Spain from 2 to 11 May 1974.

The hosts Spain won their first European title by defeating the defending champions West Germany 1–0 in the final. The Netherlands won the bronze medal by defeating England 4–1.

Preliminary round

Pool A

Pool B

Pool C

Pool D

Classification round

17th place game

Ninth to 16th place classification

9–16th place quarter-finals

9–12th place semi-finals

11th place game

Ninth place game

13th to 16th place classification

13–16th place semi-finals

15th place game

13th place game

First to eighth place classification

Quarter-finals

Semi-finals

Third place game

Final

Fifth to eighth place classification

5–8th place semi-finals

Seventh place game

Fifth place game

Final standings

References

Men's EuroHockey Nations Championship
EuroHockey Nations Championship
EuroHockey Nations Championship
International field hockey competitions hosted by Spain
Sports competitions in Madrid
Men's EuroHockey Nations Championship
Men's EuroHockey Nations Championship, 1974